The Latvian Riflemen were originally a military formation of the Imperial Russian Army assembled starting 1915 in Latvia in order to defend Baltic territories against the Germans in World War I. Initially, the battalions were formed by volunteers, and from 1916 by conscription among the Latvian population. A total of about 40,000 troops were drafted into the Latvian Riflemen Division. They were used as an elite force in the Imperial and Bolshevik armies.

Background
Towards the end of the 19th century, Riga, the future capital of Latvia, became one of the most industrialized cities in the Russian Empire. The Latvian Social Democratic Workers' Party (LSDRP) was well organized and its leading elements were increasingly sympathetic to the Bolsheviks by the time of the 1905 Revolution. When punitive expeditions were mounted by the state following this, armed resistance groups - often affiliated to the LSDRP - were set up to conduct guerilla warfare against the Tsarist regime. Many of these seasoned fighters were subsequently recruited into the Latvian Riflemen. At the outbreak of war Indriķis Lediņš, the Latvian chief of police in Vladivostok, had called for the establishment of Latvian cavalry units.

Formation
By April 1915, when the German Army was advancing into Latvian territory, some prominent Latvians, led by deputy Jānis Goldmanis used their position in the Duma to call on the Tsar to establish all-Latvian battalions. As Germany was advancing into Latvia, they argued, such units would be particularly effective. Latvians knew the area and had high morale because despite the policy of Russification, Latvian nationalist sentiments were more anti-German. At Jelgava two battalions of the Latvian Home Guard had already held back the German advance guard.

Following increasing German advances, the Russian Stavka approved the measure and on 19 July 1915, the Tsar approved the formation of the Latvian Riflemen. On the same day Latvian deputies of the State Duma, Jānis Goldmanis and Jānis Zālītis published a patriotic appeal Pulcējaties zem latvju karogiem ("Gather under Latvian flags") in Riga.
The first volunteers started to apply on August 12 at Riga. Originally, the plan was to form two battalions, but due to the high numbers of volunteers three battalions were formed.

The departure of the first Latvian volunteers from Riga to basic training transformed into a wide national demonstration since the Riflemen units were the first Latvian military units with Latvian commanders in charge.
The first battalions consisted mainly of volunteers, especially refugees from Courland and workers from the factories evacuated to inner Russia from Riga. Later a number of Latvians from other Russian units joined or were transferred to the Latvian Riflemen.

World War I
From 1915 to 1917, the Latvian Riflemen fought in the Russian army against the Germans in positions along the Daugava river. In 1916 Latvian battalions were transformed into regiments as conscription started among the local population. Also, many new riflemen units were formed. In total, eight combat and one reserve regiment were formed.
In December 1916 and January 1917, the Latvian riflemen suffered heavy casualties in the month-long Christmas Battles, which began with a surprise attack on German positions during Christmas. Suffering heavy casualties, Latvian riflemen managed to break the German line of defence but the effort was in vain as the attack was not followed through. The Russian Army lost over 26,000 soldiers in the failed attack. The casualties included 9,000 Latvian riflemen, about a third of the total number at that time. The heavy casualties resulted in a strong resentment against the Russian generals and the Tsar among the riflemen. This resentment led to increased support for the Bolsheviks, who were advocating an end to the war. The fallen Latvian Riflemen were buried at the Brothers' Cemetery in Riga, created for this purpose.

The structure of the United Latvian Riflemen division, formed in 1917:

Red Latvian Riflemen

In May 1917 large parts of the Latvian regiments transferred their loyalty to the Bolsheviks. They became known as Red Latvian Riflemen and actively participated in the Russian Civil War. The Riflemen took an active part in the suppression of anti-Bolshevik uprisings in Moscow and Yaroslavl in 1918, and fought against the forces of the White Generals Denikin, Yudenich, and Wrangel. After victory in the Oryol-Kromy operation against Denikin in October 1919, a division of Latvian Riflemen received the highest military recognition of that time: the Honorable Red Flag of VTsIK. Jukums Vācietis, formerly a colonel in the Latvian Rifles became the first commander-in-chief of the Red Army.

The Latvian Red Riflemen were instrumental in the attempt to establish Soviet rule in Latvia in 1919. They suffered great losses of personnel due to the decreasing popularity of Bolshevik ideas among the Latvian Riflemen and Latvians generally, and the majority were re-deployed to other fronts of the Russian Civil War. The remaining forces of the Red Army in Latvia were defeated by Baltic German volunteers under General von der Goltz and newly formed Latvian units initially under Colonel Kalpaks and later under Colonel Jānis Balodis, who were loyal to the Latvian Republic in western Latvia; by the Estonian Army including the North Latvian Brigade, and finally by a joint campaign of the Polish and new Latvian army in Latgale, south-eastern Latvia.

Following the 1920 peace treaty between Latvia and Bolshevik Russia, 11,395 former Red Riflemen returned to Latvia.

Other former Riflemen remained in Soviet Russia and rose to leadership positions in the Red Army, Communist Party, and Cheka. When the USSR occupied Latvia in 1940, many of the surviving Red Riflemen returned to Latvia.

The most famous pre-World War II Soviet Communist leaders from Latvia were not from the Red Riflemen: Martin Latsis, Jēkabs Peterss, Arvīds Pelše, Yan Karlovich Berzin, Yan Rudzutak, Pēteris Stučka, Robert Eikhe. All of them, except for Stučka (who died in 1932) and Pelše, perished in the Great Purges of 1937–1940.

White Latvian Riflemen
In 1917, a smaller number of Latvian Riflemen, mostly officers, sided against the Bolsheviks. Officers such as Kārlis Goppers and Frīdrihs Briedis tried to prevent Bolshevik ideas from spreading among the Latvian soldiers. The bloody Christmas and January battles impeded their efforts to fight against Bolshevik ideology. Opponents of Bolshevism either left or were forced to leave military service or joined the White forces. During the last phase of the Civil War, two Latvian units were created in the Urals and Far East of Russia (Troitsk Battalion and Imanta Regiment), but they did not take part in significant military action and were sent to Latvia, by then already an independent nation.

In culture 

The Latvian Riflemen have a been long-lasting source of inspiration in Latvian art. Many writers, poets and painters have been inspired by the Latvian Rifles and their battles. The most notable works are:
A collection of epic poetry about Latvian Riflemen and their battles in Latvia and Russia, Mūžības skartie (Affected by Eternity) by poet Aleksandrs Čaks.
Historical novel Blizzard of Souls (Dvēseļu putenis) by writer Aleksandrs Grīns, himself a former riflemen. The main protagonist of the novel is a young Latvian schoolboy who enlists in a Latvian rifle unit. In 2019 a film based on the novel premiered.
A series of paintings (Latvian Riflemen 1916–1917 and Refugees 1915–1917) by the Latvian painter Jāzeps Grosvalds, who had also served in Latvian Riflemen units.

The Latvian pagan metal band Skyforger has the album Latviešu strēlnieki (Latvian Riflemen) dedicated to the Latvian Riflemen and their battles in the World War I.

A former Latvian rifleman is the protagonist of the 2007 film Defenders of Riga, set in the final days of World War I and the subsequent Latvian War of Independence.

See also

4th Rifle Division (Poland)
Aftermath of World War I
Estonian Liberation War
Estonian Red Riflemen
Freikorps in the Baltic
Latvian War of Independence
Lithuanian Riflemen's Union
Ober Ost
Polish Rifle Squads
Ukrainian Sich Riflemen

References

Sources 

 ,

External links
 Latvian Rifles

 
Russian Civil War
Military history of the Soviet Union
1910s in Latvia
Military history of Latvia
Military units and formations of World War I
World War I
Red Guards (Russia)